The Romanian Writers' Society was a professional association based in Bucharest, Romania, that aided the country's writers and promoted their interests. Founded in 1909, it operated for forty years before the early communist regime transformed it into the Writers' Union of Romania.

Background and founding
Toward the end of the 19th century, an increasing number of Romanian writers began to feel the need for a professional association that would defend their interests before editors and bookstores and facilitate mutual aid. Although the circle surrounding Literatură și artă magazine shared these objectives, the idea of a freestanding association developed later and under some pressure from foreign professional organizations concerned about intellectual property rights. Thus, the circle became the Romanian Society for Literature and Art, recognized by law in May 1904. The society included artists of all kinds, with widely diverging interests, as well as artists' descendants and art collectors. Its presidents were Dimitrie C. Ollănescu-Ascanio, Alexandru Dimitrie Xenopol and George Bengescu-Dabija, while N. Petrașcu served as secretary. Its main achievement was an international congress on intellectual property regulation held at Bucharest in 1906. Bucharest city hall donated land for the construction of an artists' house, but it appears the lot was put to a different use. In 1903-1904, the press mentioned other initiatives for setting up a writers' society; one of these belonged to Transylvanians Ilarie Chendi and Ștefan Octavian Iosif.

In 1908, several poets and prose writers, headed by Cincinat Pavelescu, founded an association they called the Romanian Writers' Society. The founding meeting was held on April 28, the 70th anniversary of the Société des gens de lettres' establishment. Twenty writers were present, and the leadership committee was composed of the following: Pavelescu, president; George Ranetti and Dimitrie Anghel, vice presidents; Constantin Sandu-Aldea and Mihail Sadoveanu, accountants; Ioan Adam and George Murnu, treasurers; Emil Gârleanu and Ludovic Dauș, secretaries; Iosif, librarian; Virgil Caraivan, cashier. The original statute does not survive, but much later accounts indicate it was inspired by the French model. The small number of participants was due to the lack of interest by older writers, the opposition of certain public figures to the society's strictly professional character, and the exclusion of literary critics, a clause against which Chendi vehemently protested. The event was barely remarked by the press; Ion Scurtu predicted the "shaky" group would meet an "early demise". By the middle of the following year, amidst a deteriorating literary atmosphere, the need for a relaunch became apparent. In July 1909, Anghel and Iosif launched an appeal for a writers' congress, an effort to which Chendi rallied. Conditions did not allow for this to take place, but it was decided that a new writers' society should be founded. A sixteen-member committee would meet in August, presided over by Anghel, and the founding meeting was scheduled for early September. The initiative was promoted in the press, with the editor of Minerva newspaper, Vasile Savel, publishing a series of articles on the need for a society and its possible goals. Although launched hurriedly in the middle of the summer holidays, the articles were a success, with responses garnered from Constantin Rădulescu-Motru, Adam, Chendi, Eugen Lovinescu, Sadoveanu, Scurtu, Anghel, Iosif and Nicolae N. Beldiceanu. Additionally, Nicolae Iorga, Simion Mehedinți, Corneliu Moldovanu, Dimitrie Teleor and Aurel Alexandrescu-Dorna opined on the topic in their own periodicals. Of the responders, only Iorga objected, considering the idea materialistic and unsuitable for "the true purposes of national literature".

Sadoveanu had an important role in the preparatory work, enlisting the help of his friends from Viața Românească. The constituent meeting took place as scheduled, in the amphitheater of Gheorghe Lazăr High School, under Anghel's direction. Twenty-five writers attended, while a further twenty-five, who were then in other parts of the Romanian Old Kingdom or in Bukovina and Transylvania, gave their proxy votes to attendees or sent letters of affiliation. (Newspaper accounts differ slightly, with some giving a figure of 47 total participants. Of the twenty 1908 society founders, sixteen were present.) The meeting discussed the society's name, elected the committee and drafter a plan of action. The Romanian Writers' Society (SSR) name was selected, and its objectives of defending and aiding writers defined. It specified member would be divided into categories of active, honorary and donors. One of the criteria for active membership was the holding of Romanian citizenship, a problem for the many participants from Transylvania, Bukovina and Macedonia who were foreign nationals. It was decided that older writers and leading critics would soon be invited to join, with the exception of Iorga, in view of his "negative and offensive" attitude; they would be free to choose between active and honorary status. The committee elected was composed of Sadoveanu, president; Anghel, vice president; Gârleanu, secretary and librarian; Artur Stavri, Octavian Goga, Iosif, Chendi, Ion Minulescu, Zaharia Bârsan, members; Lovinescu and Pavelescu, accountants. In order to give the society a more permanent character, it was decided to organize literary meetings in towns and in the countryside, and well as in Transylvania and Bukovina; to acquire a headquarters; to publish a bulletin and to gain legal recognition.

Early years
Over the following months, the committee offered the honorary presidency to Queen Elisabeth and attempted to attract older writers. Of these, Alexandru Vlahuță seemed the most sensitive to the problems of younger writers. After obtaining a pledge of financial aid from minister Spiru Haret, he launched a public appeal for a writers' publishing house in Universul newspaper. He believed the press should operate under its own committee formed of Vlahuță's generational colleagues, and the SSR committee rejected the project, which later failed. Titu Maiorescu, Ioan Slavici, Barbu Ștefănescu Delavrancea and Ion Luca Caragiale all kept their distance from the new organization. Rădulescu-Motru's political views caused his departure, but Mihail Dragomirescu joined in 1911. Invited to join, the Imperial Russian-born Jewish critic Constantin Dobrogeanu-Gherea penned an open letter to Anghel in which he lamented that membership was based not on the value of one's work but on one's birth certificate, ironically observing that he could not obtain it, as a trip to Russia would be hazardous for him. Anghel replied that Gherea could join, as he held Romanian citizenship. However, a number of non-citizen Jewish writers and critics sided with Gherea, creating an unfavorable atmosphere for the SSR. Amid rising polemics, in January 1910 the society asked the Romanian Parliament to reject a law granting citizenship to Jewish critic Eugen Porn. The appearance of Cumpăna magazine, edited by four leaders of the SSR (Anghel, Chendi, Iosif and Sadoveanu), appeared to be a secessionist gesture and nearly led to the society's dissolution. The break in the friendship between Anghel and Iosif also proved unfortunate. Nevertheless, the SSR remained active, within its first six months organizing meetings in Ploiești, Buzău, Galați and Piatra Neamț, as well as a tour through Bukovina. A temporary headquarters, with a library and donated artistic objects, was set up in a hotel apartment; this was destroyed by fire in January 1911. Conferences in Transylvania's Sibiu (March 1911) and Arad (April–May 1911) proved invigorating and had a notable impact on the Romanian literary scene. The second general meeting, held that November, saw the admission of at least 37 new members, including Alexandru Macedonski, Ioan Alexandru Brătescu-Voinești (later considered a founder), Duiliu Zamfirescu and Dragomirescu, as well as the young Tudor Arghezi, Gala Galaction and Nicolae Davidescu. A new committee was chosen, with Gârleanu as president. Soon, a law recognizing the SSR as a legal entity was adopted, coming into effect in March 1912. Henceforth, it could receive donations and subsidies. A first subsidy, granted by Constantin C. Arion, came to 3000 lei and was divided among the members. An almanac for 1912 and 1913 was printed, although the planned bulletin had yet to appear.

The society continued to consolidate following its November 1912 congress, when Dragomirescu was elected president. Although Alexandru Davila, Brătescu-Voinești, Anghel, Natalia Anghel, Sadoveanu and his colleagues from Iași (some of whom later returned) subsequently withdrew, ten new members were received in 1912, eighteen in 1914 and ten in 1915. The first bulletin appeared in 1916; it mentioned that in June 1915, at the close of George Diamandy's first stint as president, there were 108 members, of whom 33 were founders. (The latter number was off: six were omitted, and this was later corrected.) The SSR was accumulating wealth due to the annual 3000-leu subsidy, a bequest of 10,000 lei from the late King Carol I, membership fees and admission fees to lectures and theatrical shows. By the mid-1910s, the society was beginning to commemorate deceased writers and build monuments in their honor.

World War I and interwar period
Unsurprisingly, the society's activities diminished once Romania entered World War I in 1916. Its presidents during the war and its aftermath were Zamfirescu (1916), Sadoveanu (1917-1919) and Dragomirescu (1919-1921). During the latter's tenure, the congress of March 1920 decided to expel those writers proven to have collaborated with the pro-German press during the wartime occupation of Bucharest. However, the measure was not put into effect, as such individuals, including Arghezi, Galaction and Dem. Theodorescu, continued to appear in the membership lists. After the 1918 union of Transylvania, the Banat, Bukovina and Bessarabia with Romania, there was a massive influx of new members. Moldovanu, who was president from 1921 to 1923, in fact declared that he wanted all Romanian writers to join. At the beginning of his second term, there were 223 active members; another 40 entered during the subsequent presidencies of Sadoveanu (1923-1924) and Goga (1925).

Liviu Rebreanu subsequently became president, remaining until February 1932; during his term, there was an attempt to address the problem posed by the numerous dilettantes who had become members. The statutes were modified and committees set up to remove those who did not fulfill the conditions for admission. A 1928 list shows that as of January 1925, there were 18 honorary and 155 active members; at the beginning of 1939, there were 239 active members.

The prestige the SSR had acquired ensured that a secessionist group founded by Romulus Dianu in 1933, the Association of Independent Writers, proved a failure; and that regional writers' groups in Oltenia, Transylvania and Bessarabia remained of marginal importance. Thanks to the importance of contemporary writers, as well as the symbolic capital acquired by some of them (including Goga, Alexandru Lapedatu, Ion Pillat, Nichifor Crainic, Rebreanu and Mihai Ralea), and their presence in influential government and legislative posts, the interwar period saw the SSR receiving a series of subsidies from certain ministries (Education, Arts, Finance, Labor, Interior) as well as other institutions. In certain years, funding also came from the profits of the Constanța Casino, from the fees received during the monthlong festival of Bucharest and from the fairly generous sums paid by the studios for film censorship. After many promises that were never honored, in 1934 the city hall granted a lot for a Writers' Palace. This was centrally located on Carol I Boulevard and valued at some 4.5 million lei. The following year, upon the initiative of Nicolae M. Condiescu, who served as president from 1935 to 1939, a building fund was set up. Due to generous donations from Condiescu's associate King Carol II, as well as from ministries and banks, the fund quickly reached 6.8 million lei. Representing only a small part of SSR revenue were membership fees (almost invariably overdue), tickets to conferences and plays and admissions from balls. The society tried its hand in business: a lottery, two movie theaters (in Brașov and Arad), postcards with the faces of famous writers, medals; these either resulted in small revenues or in losses. In 1931, the failure of the Marmorosch Blank Bank severely impacted the society, which had deposits of over 10 million lei, of which it recovered but a small part. Using what it had left over, it somewhat managed to meet its statutory objectives. Starting just after World War I, the society granted pensions to the widows and children of deceased writers (Macedonski, Chendi, George Coșbuc, Gârleanu, Slavici and Panait Istrati, as well as to the sisters of Mihail Eminescu). It also financed writers who found themselves in difficult straits, such as Maria Cunțan, Ion Gorun, Panait Mușoiu, Artur Enășescu, Eugen Boureanul, Caton Theodorian, Alexandru Obedenaru and George Bacovia. In 1939, this burden was somewhat lessened when the Ralea-led Labor Ministry founded the Writers' Pension Fund. Every year, the society gave out aid that amounted to almost twice what it paid in pensions. From 1929 to 1931, two travel grants of 50,000 lei each were handed out, and another one was given for 1936-1937. The SSR granted Căile Ferate Române rail passes; their number fluctuated between 16 and 45. It also funded rest trips to the Sâmbăta de Sus palace and the main hotel in Bușteni. In 1936, Bucharest city hall decided to grant house lots to five writers annually, but the measure ended up being purely financial. A substantial annual expenditure for the SSR were the loans it paid to its members, rarely paid back on time.

Prizes
The society's prizes served a double role: material rewards for writers, but also the building of reputations. According to a 1924 statute, they were divided into two categories: those established by the society itself and those started by private individuals, institutions or authorities on the society's behalf. The first category comprised three annual prizes; the first two were for poetry and prose, while the third had varying purposes such as debut works, translation or sonnets. The second category included other prizes, generally more substantial: the I. Al. Brătescu-Voinești prize for the novel (20,000 and later 25,000 lei); the C. A. Rosetti prize, started by Viitorul newspaper (20,000 lei); the Socec prize for poetry, from 1924 to 1930 (10,000 lei); the King Carol II prize, from 1934 to 1940 (25,000 lei). Others came from private donations, such as the Ștefan I. Costacopol prize for criticism, involving 6000 lei and awarded from 1931 to 1945; or from prize money that was returned. The statute specified that the awarding committee was to be selected by the SSR leadership. The interwar press was rife with disgruntled comments and contestations of successive prize committees, but overall, very few obvious mistakes were made.

The prose prize went to: Calistrat Hogaș (1922), Gheorghe Brăescu (1923), Lucia Mantu, Jean Bart and Rebreanu (1924), Henriette Yvonne Stahl, Brăescu and Davidescu (1925), Boureanul, Rebreanu and I. A. Bassarabescu (1926), Boureanul, Vasile Demetrius and Savel (1927), Hortensia Papadat-Bengescu, Emanoil Bucuța and Ion Foti (1928), I. C. Vissarion, Davidescu and Demetrius (1929), Alexandru Cazaban, Brăescu and Mateiu Caragiale (1930), Ion Petrovici and Camil Petrescu (1931), Sergiu Dan and George Mihail Zamfirescu (1932), G. M. Vlădescu and Galaction (1933), Mircea Damian and Victor Ion Popa (1934), Anton Holban, Neagu Rădulescu, Horia Furtună, Mihail Celarianu and Octav Dessila (1935), Papadat-Bengescu and Mircea Eliade (1936), Mircea Gesticone, Dauș and Ioan Missir (1938), Zamfirescu and Radu Boureanu (1939).

The poetry prize recipients were: George Gregorian and Al. T. Stamatiad (1922), Claudia Millian and G. Talaz (1923), Davidescu and Moldovanu (1924), Foti, Constantin Râuleț and Adrian Maniu (1925), Aron Cotruș, Ion Dongorozi, Radu Gyr and Bacovia (1926), Perpessicius, George Dumitrescu, Artur Enășescu and Pillat (1927), Vasile Voiculescu, Zaharia Stancu and Boureanu (1928), Celarianu, Arghezi and Talaz (1929), Ion Barbu, Lucian Blaga and Eugen Jebeleanu (1930), Eugeniu Sperantia and Stamatiad (1931), Ilarie Voronca, D. Nanu and Virgil Gheorghiu (1932), Boureanu and Dan Botta (1933), Dumitrescu, N. Crevedia, Simion Stolnicu and Maria Banuș (1934), Mircea Streinul, Emil Gulian, Maniu and Vlaicu Bârna (1935), Ștefan Baciu (1936), Iulian Vesper, Teofil Lianu and Șerban Bascovici (1938), Celarianu, Emil Giurgiuca, Gyr and Aurel Chirescu (1939).

During the same period, the society hosted or participated in events to commemorate deceased writers, as well as celebrations of living ones for various occasions. Relations with PEN International and with foreign writers' societies were strengthened, their representatives welcomed to Romania. Likewise, SSR committee members were invited to societies and congresses abroad.

World War II
The outbreak of World War II had important ramifications for the society's activities. At the time, its president was N. I. Herescu, who took over after Condiescu's death. Following significant territorial losses by Romania during the summer of 1940, a significant number of writers became refugees. They received aid from the society, which dramatically depleted its funds.

After the National Legionary State came to power that September, the committee aligned itself with regime policy, and in early October decided to expel eleven Jewish writers: Felix Aderca, Camil Baltazar, Dan, A. Dominic, Scarlat Froda, Virgil Monda, I. Peltz, Mihail Sebastian, Leopold Stern, A. Toma and Voronca. The project for a Writers' Palace was temporarily abandoned, with its fund loaned for the benefit of the army. (The promissory notes probably became invalid after the nationalization of the banks in June 1948.) Due to a fall in subsidies and other revenue and a rise in aid and loans disbursed, the number of prizes awarded fell. Thus, the only honorees were Nicolae Ottescu, Ruxanda Levente, George Lesnea, Pompiliu Constantinescu, Gheorghiu, George Ionescu and Bascovici in 1940; Stahl, Demetrius, Alexandru Busuioceanu, Eugen Bălan, Radu Tudoran, Dumitru Almaș, Dragoș Protopopescu, Otilia Cazimir, Ion Buzdugan and Stelian Constantin-Stelian, in 1941; Alexandru Al. Philippide, Mihail Șerban, Cotruș, Ovidiu Papadima, Boureanu, Octav Sargețiu, Mircea Mărcoiu and Laura Dragomirescu in 1942. The society continued to maintain relations with similar bodies in Italy, Germany, Spain, France, Croatia, Slovakia and Finland.

The events of 23 August 1944 forced another radical change for the society. At the beginning of September, a group of thirty writers called for a general assembly, citing the absence of Herescu (who was abroad and unable to return) and the presence in the committee of individuals compromised by collaboration with the deposed Ion Antonescu regime. The meeting happened later in the month, and was declared valid, despite the absence of many members who did not reside in Bucharest. The assembly, attended by the Jewish writers removed in 1940, proceeded to elect a committee, with the most votes going to the list headed by Victor Eftimiu as president. The new committee members were N. D. Cocea, Papadat-Bengescu, Cezar Petrescu, Cazaban, Celarianu, Stancu (who resigned and was replaced by Perpessicius), Mihai Beniuc, Lucia Demetrius, Boureanu, Cicerone Theodorescu and Jebeleanu. By the end of November, successive meetings of the committee had resulted in an unknown number of expulsions, with a further 46 members suspended but given the possibility of accounting for their past deeds. The list presented in the 1945 bulletin indicates that 28 members were purged. Not among these were several who had already received public opprobrium (Davidescu, Crevedia, Marta Rădulescu), or those who had gone into voluntary exile (Cotruș, Eliade, Busuioceanu). In their place, Cocea proposed inviting 51 new members, of whom twenty mainly left-leaning individuals were accepted: Banuș, Ury Benador, Geo Bogza, George Călinescu, Ion Călugăru, Emil Dorian, Alexandru Kirițescu, Barbu Lăzăreanu, George Magheru, Alexandru Mironescu, Dinu Nicodin, Miron Radu Paraschivescu, Dan Petrașincu, Ion Pas, Alexandru Rosetti, George Silviu, Henric Sanielevici, Tudor Teodorescu-Braniște, Tudoran and Gheorghe Zane.

Final years
By May 1945, when Eftimiu was speaking to justify the purges and welcome rising Soviet influence, he was responding to the policies of the new Romanian Communist Party-dominated government. These were in the process of transforming the SSR into a tool for achieving the party's objective of a literary activity entirely subordinate to the authorities. Meanwhile, the society's professional role was largely ceded for a time to the Union of Artists', Writers' and Journalists' Syndicates, a body founded in August 1945. Much easier to manipulate, the latter began handling both material reward and penalties, such as the purges of October 1947.

Following the membership overhaul of 1944-1945, the total number of affiliates rose to 268. A further 32 writers were admitted during the May 1946 congress, and probably as many were taken in at the September 1947 assembly that re-elected Eftimiu as president. The new committee also included Galaction, Cocea, Cezar Petrescu, Celarianu, Ion Popescu-Puțuri, Lucia Demetrius, Călugăru, Theodorescu, Dinu Bondi and Stancu as members; Carol Ardeleanu and Dumitru Corbea as accountants; Vintilă Russu-Șirianu, Bogza, Teofil Rudenco, Agatha Bacovia, Toma and C. Argeșanu as the honoring jury; and Baltazar, Aurel Baranga, Oscar Lemnaru, Tudor Șoimaru and Sașa Pană as alternate members.

During the same assembly, Stancu pointedly condemned those who were resisting the nascent regime and its cultural policies. Near the end of the month, a meeting of ethnic Hungarian writers in Cluj decided to join the SSR, so that the latter changed its name to the Society of Writers from Romania in January 1948. At the same time, Stancu was elected to replace Eftimiu, who went on to chair the National Theatre Bucharest. In early 1949, a reorganization assembly was announced. This took place in late March, in the presence of the state and party leadership; it was decided to transform what was by then the Society of Writers from the Romanian People's Republic into the Union of Writers from the Romanian People's Republic, now the Writers' Union of Romania. A new statute was adopted, and a literary fund established.

Presidents

Mihail Sadoveanu (1909-1911)
Emil Gârleanu (1911-1912)
Mihail Dragomirescu (1912-1914)
George Diamandy (1914-1916)
Duiliu Zamfirescu (1916-1917)
Mihail Sadoveanu (1917-1919)
Mihai Dragomirescu (1919-1921)
Corneliu Moldovanu (1921-1923)
Mihail Sadoveanu (1923-1924)
Octavian Goga (1924-1925)
Liviu Rebreanu (1925-1932)
Corneliu Moldovanu (1932-1935)
Nicolae M. Condiescu (1935-1939)
N. I. Herescu (1939-1944)
Victor Eftimiu (1944-1948)

Notes

1909 establishments in Romania
Organizations established in 1909
1949 disestablishments in Romania
Romanian writers' organizations